Ira Davenport Memorial Hospital
 is a century-old medical facility in upstate New York that in 2011 became part of the Arnot Health System.

History
Major funds for the hospital came from the closing of an orphanage that ran for 94 years which was founded by Ira Davenport. These funds enlarged and enhanced a 1910-founded hospital located in Bath, New York previously known as Bath Hospital. In 1990 a 120-bed nursing home named Fred & Harriett Taylor Health Center was opened adjacent to the hospital. The combined complex was renamed Davenport & Taylor Medical Center.

They're regarded as a rural hospital, and receive funding from the Federal Low Volume Hospital funding program, that enables such facilities to have an MRI machine in a region that would otherwise have none.

References

  

Hospitals in New York (state)